Sae Island is the northernmost island within the Western Islands of the Bismarck Archipelago, Papua New Guinea. It is located just north-west of the Kaniet Islands, under which it is often subsumed, although the two are distinct. Another name for the Kaniet(-Sae) Islands is "Anchorite Islands".

The first sighting by Europeans of Sae Island was by the Spanish navigator Iñigo Órtiz de Retes on 21 August 1545 when on board of the carrack San Juan tried to return from Tidore to New Spain.

References

Bismarck Archipelago
Islands of Papua New Guinea
Manus Province